The Teenui-Mapumai by-election was a by-election in the Cook Islands electorate of Teenui–Mapumai.  It took place on 8 June 2006, and was precipitated by the retirement of Upoko Simpson.

The by-election was won by Speaker of the Cook Islands Parliament Norman George.

References

By-elections in the Cook Islands
2006 elections in Oceania
2006 in the Cook Islands